Josh Walker (born 12 November 1992) is a former professional Australian rules footballer who has played for the Geelong Football Club, Brisbane Lions and the North Melbourne Football Club in the Australian Football League (AFL).

AFL career
He made his debut in round 16, 2012, against  at the MCG. He is the grandson of Geelong premiership player Peter Walker.   
A strong-marking ruck/forward who found his place in the team limited behind Tom Hawkins and James Podsiadly. Once Podsiadly left for  he was selected as the second tall forward, he managed 33 games and 35 goals in four seasons.

After four years at the Lions, he was delisted at the conclusion of the 2019 AFL season at which time he accepted an offer to play for North Melbourne. In 2020, Walker signed a contract extension to play for North until the end of 2021. After a strong 2021 season, Walker signed another one-year extension with the Kangaroos, extending his contract until at least the end of the 2022 season. Walker mostly  played as a defender for North and was a regular starting player during his time at the club where he was known as a strong intercept marker. Shortly after the 2022 season, Walker was advised by the Kangaroos that he wouldn’t be offered a contract by the club for 2023. Walker subsequently announced his retirement from the AFL in December 2022 after a career of 139 Games in the league.

References

External links

1992 births
Living people
Geelong Football Club players
Geelong Falcons players
Australian rules footballers from Victoria (Australia)
Brisbane Lions players
North Melbourne Football Club players